Augustus of Brunswick-Lüneburg may refer to:

 Augustus the Elder, Duke of Brunswick-Lüneburg (1568–1636), also called Augustus I
 Augustus the Younger, Duke of Brunswick-Lüneburg (1579–1666), also called Augustus II
 Augustus William, Duke of Brunswick-Wolfenbüttel (1662–1731)
 Augustus William, Duke of Brunswick-Bevern (1715–1781)
 William Augustus, Duke of Brunswick-Harburg (1564–1642)
 Rudolph Augustus, Duke of Brunswick-Wolfenbüttel (1627–1704)
 Ernest Augustus, Elector of Brunswick-Lüneburg (1629–1698)